Rajeev Ram was the champion in 2009; however, he lost to qualifier Raven Klaasen in the second round.Mardy Fish defeated Olivier Rochus in the final 5–7, 6–3, 6–4.

Seeds

Draw

Finals

Top half

Bottom half

References
Main Draw
Qualifying Draw

Singles